Charlotte Chable (born 31 October 1994) is a Swiss former alpine ski racer. She competed at the 2015 World Championships in Beaver Creek, USA, where she placed 15th in the slalom.

World Cup results

World Championship results

References

External links
 
 
 Charlotte Chable World Cup standings at the International Ski Federation
 

1994 births
Swiss female alpine skiers
Living people
21st-century Swiss women